is a Japanese manga series written and illustrated by Masami Yuki. It was serialized in Shogakukan's Weekly Shōnen Sunday from October 1994 to September 2000, and compiled into 26 tankōbon volumes.

Plot
Jaja Uma Grooming Up! depicts the story of Shunpei Kuze, a high-school student unsure of the future until he takes a motorcycle ride to Hokkaidō. When his motorbike runs out of fuel, Shunpei is stranded on a country road; to make matters worse, he loses his wallet. He is found and taken in by the daughter of a local rancher named Hibiki Watarai. Shunpei begins a new life on the Watarai horse-breeding ranch, learning about the horses and the ranch's lively family and workers.

Publication
Jaja Uma Grooming Up! is written and illustrated by Masami Yuki. The series started its serialization in Shogakukan's Weekly Shōnen Sunday on October 19, 1994, and finished on September 27, 2000. Shogakukan compiled the series into twenty-six individual tankōbon volumes, which were published between March 18, 1995 and November 18, 2000. Shogakukan re-released the series into a 14-volume bunkoban edition from December 13, 2003 to December 15, 2004.

References

Further reading

External links
Official site, part of the author's site 

1994 manga
Horse racing in anime and manga
Masami Yuki
Shogakukan manga
Shōnen manga